Pseudhammus rothschildi is a species of beetle in the family Cerambycidae. It was described by Charles Joseph Gahan in 1909.

References

rothschildi
Beetles described in 1909